img or IMG is an abbreviation for image.

img or IMG may also refer to:

 IMG (company), global sports and media business headquartered in New York City but with its main offices in Cleveland, originally known as the "International Management Group", with divisions including:
 IMG Academy, an athletic training complex in Bradenton, Florida with facilities for multiple sports
 IMG Artists, a performing arts management company with multiple worldwide offices
 IMG College, a college sports marketing agency based in Winston-Salem, North Carolina
 IMG Models, a modeling agency based in New York
 IMG (file format), the file extension of several different disk image formats which store a full digital representation (image) of disk drive or storage media
 IMG, a prefix for camera image file names commonly used in Design rule for Camera File system
 [img], a tag used in BBCode to place an image
 , an HTML element used to place an image; see 
 IMG Worlds of Adventure, the largest indoor amusement park in the world located in Dubai, United Arab Emirates
 Imagination Technologies, a semiconductor IP company (also known as ImgTec)
 Inside Mac Games, a game news site for the Macintosh
 Integrated Microbial Genomes System, a framework for comparative analysis of the genomes sequenced by the Joint Genome Institute
 International Marxist Group, a Trotskyist group in Britain between 1968 and 1982
 International medical graduate, a physician who has graduated from a medical school outside of the country in which he or she intends to practice
 International Medical Group (Uganda), a conglomerate of health-related businesses headquartered in Kampala, Uganda
 Iterated monodromy group, a concept in mathematics related to symbolic dynamics